The 2012 Challenge Cup Final was the 111th cup-deciding game of the rugby league 2012 Challenge Cup Season. It was held at Wembley Stadium in London on 25 August 2012, kick off 14:30. The final was contested by Leeds Rhinos and Warrington Wolves. The game saw Warrington beat Leeds by 35 points to 18.

Background
The 2012 Challenge Cup Final would be Leeds Rhinos third consecutive Challenge Cup Final which included a 30–6 defeat to opponents Warrington Wolves in the 2010 Final. Apart from 2010, the only other time these two sides had faced each other in the final was during the 1935–36 Challenge Cup where Leeds won 18–2. The 2012 Final would be Warrington's sixth final and Leeds's eleventh. This would be the first of two major finals these two teams would contest in the 2012 season with the teams also competing in the 2012 Super League Grand Final.

Route to the final

Leeds Rhinos
As a 2011 Super League team, Leeds entered in at the fourth round, drawing Super League side Wakefield Trinity, beating them by 38 points to 18. The fifth round saw Leeds face Super League opposition again, beating Salford Red Devils, 26 points to 10. The quarter finals saw them face Championship side Leigh Centurions, thrashing them 60 points to 12. Finally, the semi-finals saw the Rhinos draw rival club, and eventual Super League league leaders, Wigan Warriors, beating them 39 points to 28.

Warrington Wolves
As a 2011 Super League team, Warrington also entered in at the fourth round. A fourth round victory over Championship side Keighley Cougars saw them progress to the fifth round where a beat Super League side Bradford Bulls 32 points to 16. The Wolves faced London Broncos in the quarter finals, thrashing them 50 points to 14. Finally, Warrington faced Huddersfield Giants in the semi-finals, thrashing them by 33 points to 8.

Match details

References

Challenge Cup finals
Leeds Rhinos matches
Warrington Wolves matches
August 2012 sports events in the United Kingdom
2012 sports events in London